Alexander William Duncan (19 June 1881 – 18 November 1934) was a Scottish international rugby and cricket player.

He also played for University of Edinburgh RFC.

He also played for the Scotland national cricket team.

References
 Bath, Richard (ed.) The Scotland Rugby Miscellany (Vision Sports Publishing Ltd, 2007 )
 Massie, Allan A Portrait of Scottish Rugby (Polygon, Edinburgh)

See also
 List of Scottish cricket and rugby union players

1881 births
1934 deaths
Alumni of the University of Edinburgh
Cricketers from Midlothian
Edinburgh University RFC players
Rugby union players from Midlothian
Scotland international rugby union players
Scottish cricketers
Scottish rugby union players